Sapna Sharma is a Canadian limnologist and associate professor of biology at York University. Sharma studies human-induced environmental stressors and holds the York University Research Chair in Global Change Biology.  She obtained her PhD at the University of Toronto and held post-doctoral fellowships at the University of Montreal and the Center for Limnology at the University of Wisconsin–Madison.

As of 2021, Sharma is a recipient of the Provostial Fellowship at York University. Sharma's project, "Working Towards Equitable Access to Clean Water", will combine student and staff efforts in raising awareness and identifying solutions to poor access to clean water around the world.

Research 
Sharma's research takes interdisciplinary, team science, Citizen Science, and data synthesis approaches to examine and predict the effects of environmental stressors on ecosystems. She has led the assembly, integration and analysis of large, long-term aquatic datasets that enable meta-analysis on a global scale. This approach has revealed how climate change is producing abiotic and biotic seasonal changes (phenology). Sharma's research group also examines how to improve the quantitative approaches used to generate these predictions.

Sharma's research on climate change and global warming has examined shrinking ice cover of freshwater lakes, and how fish distributions will be affected by a warming climate. The relation of ice cover loss to its impact on recreational ice skating in northern countries such as Canada, the United States, Sweden and Norway was widely covered in international media, as well as local news outlets in communities directly impacted by her research. Her work on the impact to freshwater fisheries projected that in Ontario alone climate change would impact the trout fishery in over 1,600 lakes by 2050, and 9,700 by 2100.

Selected

References

External links 
 
 

Year of birth missing (living people)
Living people
Academics of the University of York
University of Toronto alumni
Canadian people of Indian descent
Women limnologists